Charlotte P. Morris is an American academic administrator. She served as the interim president of Tuskegee University, a private, historically black university in Tuskegee, Alabama, and on July 26, 2021, was elected ninth president of the university by its board of trustees, effective August 1, 2021.

Early life
Morris was born in Kosciusko, Mississippi and is African-American. She graduated from Jackson State University, where she earned a bachelor's degree in business education. She subsequently earned a master's degree from Delta State University, followed by a PhD in education and business management from Kansas State University.

Career
Morris taught at Kansas State University and Trenholm State Community College. She was an administrator at Mississippi Valley State University.

Morris joined the Tuskegee Institute in 1984. Morris served as the interim president between Benjamin F. Payton and Gilbert L. Rochon in 2010. She was interim dean of the Andrew W. Brimmer College of Business and Information Science until 2017, when she began her second term as interim president. She was succeeded as president by Lily McNair in 2018. On July 26, 2021, Morris was elected ninth president of the university by its board of trustees, effective August 1, 2021.

Personal life
Morris is the widow of late Dr. William R. Morris. She has a son, and she lives in Montgomery, Alabama.

References

Living people
People from Kosciusko, Mississippi
People from Montgomery, Alabama
Jackson State University alumni
Delta State University alumni
Kansas State University alumni
Tuskegee University presidents
African-American academics
American women academics
Women heads of universities and colleges
Year of birth missing (living people)
21st-century African-American people
21st-century African-American women